Peter Gomez or Gomes may refer to:

Peter Paul Gomez, Pakistani politician
Peter J. Gomes (1942–2011), American theologian
Peter Gomez (writer), see Lirio Abbate

See also
Pedro Gomez (disambiguation)
Pedro Gomes (disambiguation)